Rose Williams (c. 1915–2015) was a Navajo potter credited with renewing interest in the Navajo pottery tradition.

Career 
Williams was a member of the most important family of Navajo potters, including her daughter Alice Cling, and her aunt Grace Barlow. Rose was trained by Barlow, and trained her daughter Cling, in turn; the three of them are credited with reviving the Navajo pottery tradition during the 20th century. By tradition, Navajo pottery was used domestically or ceremonially and was characterized by a utilitarian aesthetic; the Williams family helped define the aesthetic of contemporary Navajo pottery, enabling its inclusion in the growing market for Native American crafts

Williams learned the craft of pottery as an adult. She began selling pottery after her husband died when she was 40 years old.

Personal life 
Williams had 12 children,4 girls and 8 boys, although 2 children are deceased. Rose was an amazing person with so much character and courage. She would always light up peoples days with her smile and silly jokes. She spoke Navajo almost exclusively.

Further reading

References 

1910s births
2015 deaths
Navajo artists
Native American potters
Women potters
American women ceramists
American ceramists
20th-century Native Americans
21st-century Native Americans
20th-century Native American women
21st-century Native American women